This is a list of films based on non-fiction articles published in periodicals such as magazines or newspapers. See also List of films based on short fiction.

Adaptation. – "The Orchid Thief", The New Yorker, January 23, 1995 – Susan Orlean
Almost Famous – "The Allman Brothers Story", Rolling Stone, December 6, 1973 – Cameron Crowe
American Gangster – "The Return of Superfly", New York, August 14, 2000 – Mark Jacobson
Argo – "How the CIA Used a Fake Sci-Fi Flick to Rescue Americans From Tehran", Wired, April 2007 Joshuah Bearman
Bigger Than Life – "Ten Feet Tall", The New Yorker, September 10, 1955 – Berton Roueche
Biker Boyz – "Biker Boyz", New Times Los Angeles, April 2000, Michael Gougis
The Bling Ring – "The Suspects Wore Louboutins", Vanity Fair, March 2010 – Nancy Jo Sales
Blue Crush – "Life's Swell", Women Outside, September 1998 – Susan Orlean
Boogie Nights – "The Devil and John Holmes", Rolling Stone, May 1989 – Mike Sager
City by the Sea – "Mark of a Murderer", Esquire, September 1997 – Michael McAlary
Coyote Ugly – "The Muse of the Coyote Ugly Saloon", GQ, March 1997 – Elizabeth Gilbert
Dark Waters – "The Lawyer Who Became DuPont's Worst Nightmare", New York Times,  January 6, 2016 – Nathaniel Rich
Dog Day Afternoon – "The Boys in the Bank", Life,  September 22, 1972 – P. F. Kluge
The Fast and the Furious – "Racer X", Vibe, May 1998 – Ken Li
Fear and Loathing in Las Vegas – "Fear and Loathing in Las Vegas", Rolling Stone, November 11 & November 25, 1971 – Hunter S. Thompson
Hustlers – "The Hustlers at Scores" New York Magazine, December 28, 2015 – Jessica Pressler
In Cold Blood – "In Cold Blood: The Last to See Them Alive"' The New Yorker, September 25, 1965 – Truman Capote
The Insider – "The Man Who Knew Too Much", Vanity Fair, May 1996 – Marie Brenner
Into the Wild – "Death of an Innocent", Outside, January 1993 – Jon Krakauer
The Killing Fields – "The Death and Life of Dith Pran", The New York Times Magazine, January 20, 1980 – Sydney Schanberg
Ladybug Ladybug – "They Thought the War Was On!", McCall's, April 1963 – Lois Dickert
Live Free or Die Hard – "A Farewell to Arms", Wired, May 1997 – John Carlin
Only the Brave – "No Exit", GQ, September 27, 2013 – Sean Flynn
Our Friend – "The Friend: Love Is Not a Big Enough Word", Esquire, May 10, 2015  – Matthew Teague
Perfect – Series of articles in Rolling Stone – Aaron Latham
A Private War – "Marie Colvin's Private War" Vanity Fair, August 2012 – Marie Brenner
Proof of Life – "Adventures in the Ransom Trade" Vanity Fair, May 1998 – William Prochnau
Pushing Tin – "Something's Got to Give", The New York Times Magazine, March 24, 1996 – Darcy Frey
Radio – "Someone to Lean On", Sports Illustrated, December 16, 1996 – Gary Smith
Saturday Night Fever – "Tribal Rites of the New Saturday Night", New York, June 7, 1976 – Nik Cohn
Shattered Glass – Vanity Fair, September 1998 – Buzz Bissinger
Top Gun –  "Top Guns", California, May 1983 – Ehud Yonay
Urban Cowboy – "The Ballad of the Urban Cowboy: America's Search for True Grit", Esquire, September 12, 1978 – Aaron Latham
War Dogs – "The Stoner Arms Dealers: How Two American Kids Became Big-Time Weapons Traders", Rolling Stone, March 16, 2011 – Guy Lawson

See also
 Lists of film source material

 
Magazine articles